Eric Koch is an American attorney and politician serving as a member of the Indiana Senate from Senate District 44. He previously represented the 65th district in the Indiana House of Representatives from 2002 to 2016.

Koch and his wife, Connie, have three sons.

References

Republican Party members of the Indiana House of Representatives
Republican Party Indiana state senators
Living people
Georgetown University alumni
Indiana University Maurer School of Law alumni
Indiana lawyers
21st-century American politicians
Year of birth missing (living people)